Luchsee is a lake in Brandenburg, Germany. It lies at an elevation of 52.7 m and has a surface area is 7.2 ha. It is located in the municipality of Krausnick-Groß Wasserburg, close to the Krausnick hills. As part of the European Union's Habitats Directive, the lake protects three habitat types. In 2004, Luchsee was confirmed as a Site of Community Importance.

References

External links

Lakes of Brandenburg
Dahme-Spreewald
Bogs of Brandenburg